Viola bakeri is a species of violet known by the common name Baker's violet. It is native to the Western United States, from Washington and Oregon, to the mountains of northern Nevada, and in California to the southern High Sierra Nevada.

The plant occurs in openings in coniferous forest habitats.

Description
The leaves have lance-shaped blades up to 5 or 6 centimeters long which are borne on petioles. They are usually hairless, but may have hairs along the veins and edges.

A solitary flower is borne on an upright stem. It has five yellow petals, the lowest three marked with brown veining and the upper pair sometimes tinged with brown or purple on the outer surface.

See also
Milo Samuel Baker

External links
Jepson Manual Treatment: Viola bakeri
Washington Burke Museum
Viola bakeri — U.C. Photo gallery

bakeri
Flora of California
Flora of Oregon
Flora of Nevada
Flora of Washington (state)
Flora of the Sierra Nevada (United States)
Flora without expected TNC conservation status